Pop Wine is an album by American trumpeter Ted Curson which was recorded in France and first released on the Futura label in 1971.

Reception

Allmusic awarded the album 4 stars calling it "one of those very special dates where everything seems to go right" and stating "noteworthy are Curson's compositions here that, like much music of their time, leave tradition to the dust. He engages it and the blues in a sort of modal inquiry, where he wraps extant ideas about form, tonal sonance, and intervallic architecture in a phraseology and compositional elegance that was beyond most of his peers".

Track listing
All compositions by Ted Curson
 "Pop Wine" - 5:09
 "L.S.D. Takes a Holiday" - 12:43
 "Lonely One" - 5:46
 "Quartier Latin" - 13:18
 "Flip Top" - 6:33

Personnel
Ted Curson - trumpet, piccolo trumpet 
Georges Arvanitas - piano
Jacky Samson - bass 
Charles Saudrais - drums

References

1971 albums
Futura Records albums
Ted Curson albums